S. Nottani was an Indian filmmaker. He created the first Malayalam "talkie Balan (film) in 1938. He also directed a Malayalam movie, Gnanambika in (1940). His most contributions were mainly focused in the Tamil film industry. He directed Santhana Thevan (1937), Sathyavaani (1939), Bhaktha Gowri(1941), Sivalinga Satchi (1942) and Inbavalli(1949).

Filmography

Malayalam
Balan (1938) (first Malayalam talkie)
Gnanambika (1940)

Tamil
Santhana Thevan (1937)
Sathyavaani (1939)
Bhaktha Gowri (1941)
Sivalinga Satchi (1942)
Inbavalli (1949)

References

External links 

Film directors from Mumbai
Malayalam film directors
Tamil-language film directors
20th-century Indian film directors
1949 deaths
Filmmaking pioneers